Gentry Complex is a multi-purpose facility on the main campus of Tennessee State University (TSU) in Nashville, Tennessee. Opened in 1980 and named for Howard C. Gentry Sr., a long-time  professor, coach and athletic director at TSU, the building houses the university's Department of Health, Physical Education and Recreation and also contains an arena, dance studio, indoor track, Olympic swimming pool, racquetball courts, and the training and weight room. The 9,100-seat arena is home to the TSU Tigers men's basketball team. The Gentry Complex replaced Kean Hall Gymnasium, nicknamed "Kean's Little Garden," which had been their home for 27 years.

See also
 List of NCAA Division I basketball arenas

References

External links
Tennessee State University website
TSU athletics website

College basketball venues in the United States
Indoor arenas in Tennessee
Sports venues in Nashville, Tennessee
Tennessee State Tigers and Lady Tigers basketball
1980 establishments in Tennessee
Sports venues completed in 1980
Basketball venues in Tennessee